Daviesia subulata is a species of flowering plant in the family Fabaceae and is endemic to a restricted area in the south-west of Western Australia. It is a dense shrub with vertically flattened, sharply pointed phyllodes and yellow and red flowers.

Description

Taxonomy
Daviesia subulata was first formally described in 2017 by Michael Crisp and Gregory T. Chandler in the journal Phytotaxa from specimens collected near Morawa in 1996. The specific epithet (subulata) means "awl-shaped" or tapering to a very fine point,  referring to the phyllodes.

Distribution and habitat
This daviesia mostly grows in disturbed in open scrub in several sites near Morawa in the between Eneabba and Mingenew in the Avon Wheatbelt bioregion of south-western Western Australia.

Conservation status
Daviesia subulata is classified as "not threatened" by the Western Australian Government Department of Biodiversity, Conservation and Attractions.

References

subulata
Taxa named by Michael Crisp
Plants described in 2017
Flora of Western Australia